Waikura River is the name of two rivers in the Gisborne Region of New Zealand.
 Waikura River (Raukokore River tributary)
 Waikura River (Hangaroa River tributary)